Notre-Dame-des-Victoires is a small Roman Catholic stone church on Place Royale in the lower town of Old Quebec City. Construction was started in 1687 on the site of Champlain's habitation and was completed in 1723. The church is one of the oldest in North America.

History
Notre-Dame-des-Victoires was built atop the ruins of Champlain's first outpost. Architect Hilaire Bernard de La Rivière was the builder. Originally dedicated to l'Enfant Jésus, it received the name Notre-Dame-de-la-Victoire following the Battle of Quebec of 1690, in which an English expedition commanded by William Phips was forced to retreat. In 1711, its name was changed again, to Notre-Dame-des-Victoires, after bad weather had sunk a British fleet commanded by Hovenden Walker.

The church was largely destroyed by the British bombardment that preceded the Battle of the Plains of Abraham in September 1759. A complete restoration of the church was finished in 1816. Architect François Baillairgé led the restoration work.

The church, which was listed as a historic monument in 1929, remains a popular tourist attraction within the city, as well as a place of worship. It has undergone extensive restoration in recent decades, to restore its colonial French character. It was designated a National Historic Site of Canada in 1988 and plaqued in 1992.

In 2002, the church served as a filming location for Catch Me If You Can.

Interior
A model of the Brézé, the ship commanded by the marquis of Tracy, can be seen inside the church.

Gallery

References

Roman Catholic churches completed in 1723
Roman Catholic churches in Quebec City
1723 in Canada
18th-century Roman Catholic church buildings in Canada
Heritage buildings of Quebec
Roman Catholic churches on the National Historic Sites of Canada register
Old Quebec
1723 establishments in New France